The 2020 Florida Gators baseball team represented the University of Florida in the sport of baseball during the 2020 college baseball season. Florida competed in the Eastern Division of the Southeastern Conference (SEC). Home games were played at Alfred A. McKethan Stadium on the university's Gainesville, Florida campus, in the final season at the ballpark. The team was coached by Kevin O'Sullivan in his thirteenth season as Florida's head coach. The Gators entered the season looking to return to the College World Series after an early regional exit in last year's Lubbock Regional.

The season was cut short in stages by March 17 due to the COVID-19 pandemic. The Gators finished with a 16–1 record, tied for the best in the country, and ranked No. 1 in all major polls. A tightly contested road sweep of the Miami Hurricanes helped propel Florida to the top spot in the rankings. Not knowing at the time it would be their final game, the Gators saw their 11-game winning streak over Florida State come to an end in the last game played at McKethan Stadium.

Previous season
The Gators finished the 2019 season with a 34–26 record, compiling a 13–17 mark in the SEC.

2019 MLB draft
The Gators had five players drafted in the 2019 MLB draft.

Players in bold are signees drafted from high school that will attend Florida.

Preseason

SEC media poll
The SEC media poll was released on February 6, 2020, with the Gators predicted to finish in second place in the Eastern Division.

Personnel

By player

By position

Coaching staff

Schedule and results

Schedule

Schedule Source:
*Rankings are based on the team's current ranking in the D1Baseball poll.

Rankings

2020 MLB draft
The Gators did not have anyone selected in the 2020 MLB draft.

References

Florida
Florida Gators baseball seasons
Florida Gators baseball